Timofey Skryabin (born November 14, 1967 in Bălți, Moldovan SSR) is a retired boxer from the former Soviet Union, who represented his native country at the 1988 Summer Olympics in Seoul, South Korea. There he won the bronze medal in the flyweight division (– 51 kg). A year later he captured the silver medal in the bantamweight category (– 54 kg) at the 1989 European Amateur Boxing Championships in Athens, Greece.

1988 Olympic results
Round of 64: Defeated Zekaria Williams (Cook Islands) by decision, 5-0
Round of 32: Defeated Joseph Lawlor (Ireland) by decision, 5-0
Round of 16: Defeated Andy Agosto (Puerto Rico) by decision, 5-0
Quarterfinal: Defeated Melvin de Leon (Dominican Republic) by decision, 3-2
Semifinal: Lost to Kwang-Sun Kim (South Korea) by decision, 0-5 (was awarded bronze medal)

References
 databaseOlympics.com
 sports-reference

1967 births
Living people
Sportspeople from Bălți
Moldovan male boxers
Flyweight boxers
Boxers at the 1988 Summer Olympics
Olympic boxers of the Soviet Union
Olympic bronze medalists for the Soviet Union
Olympic medalists in boxing
Soviet male boxers
Medalists at the 1988 Summer Olympics